Lloyd George Muirhead Harris (born 24 February 1997) is a South African professional tennis player. He has been ranked as high as World No. 31 in singles by the Association of Tennis Professionals (ATP), achieved on 13 September 2021, making him the current African and South African No. 1 men's singles player. He has a career-high doubles ranking of World No. 108, achieved on 6 June 2022. Harris has won three ATP Challenger singles titles and two Challenger doubles titles and has also won 13 ITF singles titles and 4 ITF doubles titles.

Juniors
In November 2012, Harris won his first ITF junior singles title at the G5 in Windhoek, Namibia. In August 2014, Harris represented South Africa at the Youth Olympic Games.

As a junior, Harris reached a ranking of No. 38 by the International Tennis Federation, and he compiled a singles win–loss record of 73–44.

Professional career

2015–2017
Harris turned pro in 2015 and ended the year with a single ranking of 358. During the 2015 and 2016 seasons, Harris mainly played in the ITF Futures tour. In June 2015, Harris won his first ITF Futures singles title in Mozambique F2. Harris also won his first ITF Futures Doubles title in June 2015.

In 2015 Harris reached five ITF Futures tour single finals, winning four. In 2016, Harris reached eight ITF Futures tour finals, winning six.

In 2017, he reached Challenger tour semifinals in Kyoto, Japan and Kaohsiung, Chinese Taipei and qualified for his first ATP World Tour event in Antalya, Turkey.

2018: Grand Slam debut, First ATP match win
Harris started the year reaching four ITF Futures tour finals, winning three. He had a successful American hard-court summer season, winning his first ATP Challenger title at the Kentucky Bank Tennis Championships.

In August, he qualified for his first main draw at a Grand Slam at the 2018 US Open through the qualifying rounds.

In September, Harris won his first main draw match on the ATP World Tour when he defeated Gael Monfils 3–6, 6–2, 6–1 in the first round of the Chengdu Open (ATP 250 event) in China.

On 7 October 2018, Harris won his second ATP Challenger title of the year by defeating Marc Polmans 6–2, 6–2 at the Stockton Challenger.

2019: Top 100 debut
In January, Harris qualified for his second main draw at a Grand Slam at the 2019 Australian Open. 

On 4 February 2019, due to his victory at the Launceston Tennis International, Harris reached World No. 100 in the ATP rankings.

In May he reached the second round of the 2019 French Open for the first time with a win over Lukáš Rosol.

Harris also entered the main draw of the 2019 Wimbledon Championships for the first time and the 2019 US Open for the second time.

In September, he made his first ATP 250 semifinal at the Chengdu Open in China.

2021: First top 10 win, ATP 500 final, Grand Slam quarterfinal
Harris started his 2021 season in February at the Murray River Open. He lost in the first round to Egor Gerasimov. Ranked 91 at the Australian Open, he reached the third round of a Grand Slam for the first time; he lost to Mackenzie McDonald.

Seeded seventh at the Singapore Open, Harris was defeated in the first round by wildcard Adrian Andreev. Getting past qualifying at the Qatar ExxonMobil Open, he upset seventh seed, 2008 finalist, and three-time Grand Slam champion, Stan Wawrinka, in the first round. He lost in the second round to Márton Fucsovics.

Harris then qualified for the Dubai Tennis Championships. There, after beating Christopher O'Connell, he won his first match against a top 10 player by defeating top seed and world no. 3 Dominic Thiem in the first round. Harris then beat Filip Krajinović, Kei Nishikori and third seed Denis Shapovalov to reach his first ATP 500 final. He lost in the final to Aslan Karatsev.

In Washington, Harris, seeded 14th, defeated Tennys Sandgren and world no. 3 Rafael Nadal to reach the quarterfinals, where he lost to Nishikori.

At the US Open, Harris defeated 25th seed Karen Khachanov and Ernesto Escobedo to reach the third round of a Grand Slam for the first time in his career. He then defeated Denis Shapovalov for the third top 10 win of his career. In the fourth round, he defeated Reilly Opelka to reach his first Grand Slam quarterfinal. He was defeated by world no. 4 Alexander Zverev in the quarterfinals. As a result, he made his debut in the top 40.

2022: Masters 1000 fourth round, Surgery and early end of season
Harris started his 2022 season at the Adelaide International 2. Seeded fifth, he lost in the first round to Kwon Soon-woo. Seeded 30th at the Australian Open, he was defeated in the first round by Australian wildcard, Aleksandar Vukic, in four sets.

In February, Harris competed at the Rotterdam Open. He was eliminated in the first round by Ilya Ivashka. However, he reached his first ATP doubles final with German Tim Pütz. They lost in the final to Robin Haase and Matwé Middelkoop. Seeded eighth at the Qatar ExxonMobil Open, he was beaten in the first round by Márton Fucsovics. Last year finalist at the Dubai Championships, he lost in the first round to lucky loser Alex Molčan. Representing South Africa during the Davis Cup tie against Israel, Harris got his first singles win of the season by beating Daniel Cukierman in his first match. Partnering in doubles with compatriot Raven Klaasen, they lost to Daniel Cukierman and Jonathan Erlich. He then lost his second singles match to Yshai Oliel. In the end, Israel won the tie over South Africa 3-1. Seeded 30th at the Indian Wells Masters, he was eliminated in the third round by sixth seed Matteo Berrettini. In Miami, Harris upset 12th seed, Denis Shapovalov, in the second round. He ended up losing in the fourth round to eighth seed and defending champion, Hubert Hurkacz. Nevertheless, this was his best result at a Masters 1000 event.

Harris began his clay-court season at the Monte-Carlo Masters. He was beaten in the first round by Márton Fucsovics. At the Barcelona Open, he retired during his third-round match against 10th seed, Alex de Minaur, due to back spasms. At the Estoril Open, he was ousted from the tournament in the first round by lucky loser Carlos Taberner. In Madrid, he fell in the first round to Monte-Carlo finalist Alejandro Davidovich Fokina. At the Italian Open, he was defeated in the first round by Aslan Karatsev, despite having a match point in the third set tie-break. Ranked 39 at the French Open, he lost in the first round to Richard Gasquet.

On 17 June 2022, Harris announced that he will be out for the rest of the season due to a right wrist injury that required surgery.

2023: Comeback
Using a protected ranking, Harris upset Lorenzo Musetti in the first round of the Australian Open in five sets.

Personal life
Lloyd Harris was born in Cape Town, South Africa and began playing tennis at age 3 before committing professionally to the sport at 15. He speaks English and Afrikaans.

During the last tournament that his parents could afford, he qualified for two futures and made quarterfinals of one, and semi finals of the other. From this success he received enough support to play five more weeks of futures around Africa. In early 2018, he was playing in Portugal when he received the news of his father passing away the day before his match. He decided that he was going to stay and play for him and ended up winning back to back weeks.

Coaching
Harris was coached by Norman McCarthy as a child, and in 2012 at the age of 15 joined the Anthony Harris Tennis Academy. He has been coached by Anthony Harris ever since. Xavier Malisse occasionally acts as his coach while on tour.

National representation
Harris has represented South Africa at the Davis Cup where he has a win–loss record of 11–4.

Singles performance timeline

Current through the 2023 Australian Open.

ATP career finals

Singles: 2 (2 runner–ups)

Doubles: 1 (1 runner-up)

Challenger and Futures finals

Singles: 23 (16–7)

Doubles: 9 (6–3)

Record against other players

Record against top 10 players
Harris's record against players who have been ranked in the top 10. Active players are in boldface:

Wins over top 10 players 
He has a  record against players who were, at the time the match was played, ranked in the top 10.

*

Notes

References

External links

1997 births
Living people
South African male tennis players
Sportspeople from Cape Town
 Tennis players at the 2014 Summer Youth Olympics
21st-century South African people